gZhon-nu-dpal (1392-1481), also known as 'Gos Lo-tsa-ba (full name: Yid-bzang-rtse gZhon-nu-dpal) was a famous Tibetan historian and scholar, known as the author of the "Blue Annals".

Life and achievements

He was born in 1392 at lho kha 'phyongs rgyas. He was a student of the fifth Karmapa Lama, Deshin Shekpa (1384-1415), from whom he received the bodhisattva precepts, as well as Tsongkhapa, and was a teacher of the sixth Karmapa, Thongwa Dönden (1416-1453).
He was the abbot of the Karmarñing Monastery and the author of the Blue Annals.

Works
 His most famous work, the "Blue Annals" (Deb-ther sngon-po), was completed in 1478, near the end of his life, and the text was dictated by him to some of his attendants.
 'Khrul-sel, written in 1442-1443.
 His wrote a commentary on the Ratnagotravibhaga which extensively explored and contrasted Buddha-nature, described by Mathes (2008).

Footnotes

Sources

Further reading
 van der Kuijp, Leonard W. J. “On the Composition and Printings of the Deb gter sngon po by ’Gos lo tsā ba gzhon nu dpal.” JIATS, no. 2 (August 2006): 1-46.
Van der Kuijp, Leonard. The Names of 'Gos Lo tsā ba Gzhon nu dpal (1392-1481), in Prats, Ramon (ed.) The Pandita and the Siddha: Tibetan Studies in Honour of E. Gene Smith. Amnye Machen Institute
The Blue Annals. Chapter summaries from The Tibetan and Himalayan Library

External links
TBRC P318 'gos lo ts'a ba gzhon nu dpal
Gö Lotsawa Shyönnu Pal, Rigpa Wiki

Scholars of Buddhism from Tibet
Tibetan Buddhists from Tibet
1392 births
1481 deaths
14th-century Tibetan people
15th-century Tibetan people
Tibetan historians